The Judgment of Caesar is a historical novel by American author Steven Saylor, first published by St. Martin's Press in 2004. It is the tenth book in his Roma Sub Rosa series of mystery stories set in the final decades of the Roman Republic. The main character is the Roman sleuth Gordianus the Finder.

Plot summary
The year is 48 BC, and there is civil war in the Roman Empire. Caesar has defeated his rival Pompey at Pharsalos and is pursuing him towards Egypt, where king Ptolemy XIII and his sister and wife Cleopatra are struggling for power. At the same time Gordianus the Finder is traveling to Egypt with his ailing Egyptian wife, Bethesda.

Roma Sub Rosa
Fictional depictions of Julius Caesar in literature
Fictional depictions of Cleopatra in literature
2004 American novels
Cultural depictions of Pompey
Cultural depictions of Marcus Licinius Crassus
48 BC
St. Martin's Press books